is a Japanese manga series written and illustrated by Makoto Ojiro. It was serialized in Shogakukan's seinen manga magazine Weekly Big Comic Spirits from May 2016 to October 2018.

Publication
Shogakukan collected its chapters in nine tankōbon volumes, released from August 30, 2016, to December 27, 2018.

In Indonesia, the manga has been licensed by Elex Media Komputindo.

Volume list

Reception
Neko no Otera no Chion-san won the 2016 Bros Comic Awards by the Tokyo News Service's TV Bros. magazine.

See also
Insomniacs After School, another manga series by the same author

References

External links
 

Comics about cats
Romantic comedy anime and manga
Seinen manga
Shogakukan manga